Nashville is a town in Forest County, Wisconsin, United States. The population was 1,064 at the 2010 census. The unincorporated communities of Mole Lake, Nashville, and Woodlawn are located in the town. The Mole Lake Indian Reservation is also located within the town.  The town is named after G.V. Nash of Forest City, Arkansas.

Geography

Demographics
As of the census of 2000, there were 1,157 people, 485 households, and 342 families residing in the town. The population density was 17.2 people per square mile (6.7/km2). There were 1,264 housing units at an average density of 18.8 per square mile (7.3/km2). The racial makeup of the town was 67.93% White, 31.29% Native American, 0.09% from other races, and 0.69% from two or more races. Hispanic or Latino of any race were 0.35% of the population.

There were 485 households, out of which 28.7% had children under the age of 18 living with them, 53.2% were married couples living together, 10.9% had a female householder with no husband present, and 29.3% were non-families. 25.4% of all households were made up of individuals, and 8.7% had someone living alone who was 65 years of age or older. The average household size was 2.39 and the average family size was 2.79.

In the town, the population was spread out, with 26.0% under the age of 18, 6.1% from 18 to 24, 24.5% from 25 to 44, 26.4% from 45 to 64, and 16.9% who were 65 years of age or older. The median age was 40 years. For every 100 females, there were 107.0 males. For every 100 females age 18 and over, there were 99.1 males.

The median income for a household in the town was $29,750, and the median income for a family was $31,680. Males had a median income of $25,909 versus $19,438 for females. The per capita income for the town was $16,013. About 11.7% of families and 16.8% of the population were below the poverty line, including 27.8% of those under age 18 and 7.0% of those age 65 or over.

References

Towns in Forest County, Wisconsin
Towns in Wisconsin